Montague Harry "Monte" Holcroft  (14 May 1902 – 24 September 1993) was a New Zealand essayist and novelist. 

His 18½ years editing the New Zealand Listener "confirmed the Listener as a unique institution at the centre of New Zealand's cultural life".

Early life and family
Holcroft was the second of three sons, born in Rangiora on 14 May 1902 to Harry Cooper Holcroft and Harriet Emily Soanes. He was married three times and had three children, Allan Holcroft (deceased) from his first marriage and is survived by two children from his second marriage, Anthony Holcroft and Jocelyn Rimmington.

Life
In 1936, Holcroft began writing for the Southland Times and became its editor. In 1949, Holcroft was offered the editorship of the New Zealand Listener in Wellington. He took up the appointment in June 1949. He became the longest-serving editor of the New Zealand Listener.

He helped found the New Zealand branch of UNESCO.

Honours and awards
In 1947, Holcroft received the Hubert Church Award. In the 1970 New Year Honours, he was appointed an Officer of the Order of the British Empire, for services to journalism.

Works

Novels
Beyond the Breakers, John Long, 1928
The Flameless Fire, John Long, 1931
Brazilian Daughter John Long, 1931

Essays

The Deepening Stream: Cultural Influences in New Zealand (1940)

Memoir

History

Anthology
Discovered Isles: a Trilogy : The Deepening Stream, The Waiting Hills, Encircling Seas. Christchurch: Caxton Press, 1950. Voyager link
Timeless World : a Collection of Essays, Wellington: Progressive Publishing Society, 1945. Voyager link NZ Listener 323.13 Aug (1945): 12-13.

References

External links
 "M.H. Holcroft", Literary Encyclopedia

New Zealand essayists
Male essayists
1902 births
1993 deaths
People from Rangiora
People from Paekākāriki
New Zealand Officers of the Order of the British Empire
20th-century essayists